The lead worm lizard (Amphisbaena plumbea) is a worm lizard species in the family Amphisbaenidae. It is endemic to Argentina.

References

Amphisbaena (lizard)
Reptiles described in 1872
Taxa named by John Edward Gray
Endemic fauna of Argentina
Reptiles of Argentina